Dorsey Schroeder (born February 5, 1953) is an American race car driver. Since August 2015, he has served as Race Director for the Pirelli World Challenge series and since 2018 Race Director for the Trans Am Series presented by Pirelli SCCA Pro Racing. Over the course of his career in Sports car racing, he has won 40 professional races in 242 starts, including seventeen Trans-Am series wins. He also oversees the competition on-track at SVRA events and enjoys racing vintage cars.

Early life
As the son of a car dealer, Schroeder grew up around automobiles and received his first (wrecked) car from his father at the age of fourteen, and was expected to do his own repairs over the next two years.

Racing career
In 1971, at the age of 19, he became the first person under the age of 21 to be issued an SCCA National competition license.

Dorsey was a successful sports car driver throughout the 1990s in the Trans-Am series, winning the championship with Roush Racing as a rookie in the 1989 Trans-Am Series with six wins. In 1990, he was named IMSA GT Championship GTO class champion with three wins. Between 1998 and 2002, he also competed in Grand-Am and American Le Mans series events, recording a win at Mid-Ohio in 1998 for Dyson Racing. In recent years, Schroeder has competed in IMSA WeatherTech SportsCar Championship races at Daytona and Sebring in the Prototype class.

Schroeder competed in IROC in 1990 representing the SCCA Trans-Am Series
and 1991 representing IMSA Camel GT. He finished 7th in IROC XIV and 12th in IROC XV.

He was also known as a NASCAR "road course ringer," making nine Winston Cup series starts between 1991 and 2001.

He served as a color analyst for Fox Sports 1's coverage of the United SportsCar Championship and was previously a color analyst for Speed Channel's television broadcast of the Rolex Sports Car Series and American Le Mans Series. One of Dorsey's great accomplishments was being featured on the Dinner With Racers podcast.

Personal life
Dorsey currently lives in Florida with his wife Kim and daughter Carissa Schroeder from his second marriage. He used to own a seasonal restaurant in Osage Beach, Missouri, called "Dorsey's Pit Stop" until it caught fire.

Motorsports career results

SCCA National Championship Runoffs

NASCAR
(key) (Bold – Pole position awarded by qualifying time. Italics – Pole position earned by points standings or practice time. * – Most laps led.)

Winston Cup Series

Daytona 500 results

Craftsman Truck Series

International Race of Champions
(key) (Bold – Pole position. * – Most laps led.)

WeatherTech SportsCar Championship
(key) (Races in bold indicate pole position) (Races in italics indicate fastest lap)

* Season still in progress.

References

External links
 

1953 births
Living people
People from Kirkwood, Missouri
Racing drivers from Missouri
Racing drivers from St. Louis
NASCAR drivers
Trans-Am Series drivers
Motorsport announcers
International Race of Champions drivers
American Le Mans Series drivers
24 Hours of Daytona drivers
WeatherTech SportsCar Championship drivers
SCCA National Championship Runoffs participants
Rocketsports Racing drivers
Chip Ganassi Racing drivers